Kopong is a small village in Kweneng District of Botswana. It is located around 25 km north of Gaborone, the capital of Botswana. The population was 5,571 in 2001 census and 9,520 at the 2011 census, making it the sixth largest settlement in Kweneng. It is now becoming a suburb of Gaborone agglomeration home to 421,907 inhabitants at the 2011 census.

See also

List of cities in Botswana

References

Kweneng District
Populated places in Botswana